Pauntley is a village and civil parish in the district of Forest of Dean, Gloucestershire, England. In 2019 it had a population of 304.

History 
The name "Pauntley" means 'Valley wood/clearing'. Pauntley was recorded in the Domesday Book as Pantelie.

References

External links

Local government web site

Villages in Gloucestershire
Civil parishes in Gloucestershire
Forest of Dean